Ploshchad Muzhestva (Square of Fortitude) is a station of the Saint Petersburg Metro. Opened on 31 December 1975. 
The station got its name because of its location next to the eponymous square (roundabout).  
The square and the station were designed as a starting point on the way to Piskaryovskoye Memorial Cemetery where hundreds of thousands of victims, mostly civilian, of the 1941-44 siege of the city during World War II are buried.

Saint Petersburg Metro stations
Railway stations in Russia opened in 1975
Railway stations located underground in Russia